The yellow honeyeater (Stomiopera flava) is a species of bird in the family Meliphagidae.
It is endemic to Australia.

Overview
Its natural habitats are subtropical or tropical moist lowland forest and subtropical or tropical mangrove forest.

The yellow honeyeater hovers in front of the spectacular flowers of the bottlebrush orchid (Coelandria smillieae), which appear in northern Queensland between August and November, while feeding upon the nectar and pollinating the flowers.

The yellow honeyeater was previously placed in the genus Lichenostomus, but was moved to Stomiopera after a molecular phylogenetic analysis, published in 2011 showed that the original genus was polyphyletic.

Gallery

References

External links

Photos, audio and video of yellow honeyeater from Cornell Lab of Ornithology's Macaulay Library
Recordings of yellow honeyeater from Graeme Chapman's sound archive

yellow honeyeater
Birds of Cape York Peninsula
Endemic birds of Australia
yellow honeyeater
Taxonomy articles created by Polbot